Dimethylcurcumin (development code ASC-J9) is a nonsteroidal antiandrogen and a synthetic curcuminoid which is under development by AndroScience Corporation as a topical medication for the treatment of acne vulgaris. It has also been under investigation for the treatment of male pattern hair loss, spinal muscular atrophy, and wounds, but no development has been reported for these indications. There has been interest in the drug for the potential treatment of prostate cancer as well. As of 2017, it is in phase II clinical trials for acne vulgaris.

Dimethylcurcumin is an androgen receptor (AR) inhibitor and shows strong and specific antiandrogenic activity in vitro (e.g., against LNCaP cell growth) at sufficiently high concentrations. However, its mechanism of action and effects differ from those of conventional antiandrogens; it is not an antagonist of the AR and instead appears to act as a selective degradation enhancer (SARD) of certain subpopulations of the AR, for instance those present in the prostate gland.

See also
 List of investigational sex-hormonal agents § Androgenics

References

Curcuminoids
Experimental drugs
Nonsteroidal antiandrogens